Jrarbi; formerly known as Jrarati trchnafabrika (meaning "Jrarat poultry factory"), is a village in the Armavir Province of Armenia. The population was 1,600 at the 2011 census.

See also 
Armavir Province

References

Populated places in Armavir Province